NGC 346 is a young open cluster of stars with associated nebula located in the Small Magellanic Cloud (SMC) that appears in the southern constellation of Tucana. It was discovered August 1, 1826 by Scottish astronomer James Dunlop. J. L. E. Dreyer described it as, "bright, large, very irregular figure, much brighter middle similar to double star, mottled but not resolved". On the outskirts of the cluster is the multiple star system HD 5980, one of the brightest stars in the SMC.

This cluster is located near the center of the brightest H II region in the SMC, designated N66. This is positioned in the northeast section of the galactic bar. Stellar surveys have identified 230 massive OB stars in the direction of this cluster. 33 of the cluster members are O-type stars, with 11 of type O6.5 or earlier. The inner  radius of the cluster appears centrally condensed, while the area outside that volume is more dispersed. The youngest cluster members near the center have ages of less than two million years, and observations suggests the cluster is still engaged in high mass star formation. The cluster star formation rate is estimated at  yr–1.

Gallery

References

External links
 
 [http://www.esa.int/esaSC/SEMLKL4N0MF_index_0.html ''ESA'''
 Hubble Heritage site Hubble picture and information on NGC 346
 ESO Beautiful Image of a Cosmic Sculpture
 
 

Open clusters
H II regions
Star-forming regions
Small Magellanic Cloud
Tucana (constellation)
0346
18260801